"Redeemed" is a song by contemporary Christian band Big Daddy Weave from their 2012 album Love Come to Life. It was released on May 3, 2012, as the second single. The song became Weave's second Hot Christian Songs No. 1, staying there for seven weeks. It lasted 54 weeks on the overall chart, becoming their longest charting single to date. The briefly crossed over to secular radio, peaking at #25 on the Billboard Bubbling Under Hot 100. The song is played in a B major key, and 127 beats per minute.

Background 
"Redeemed" was released on May 3, 2012, as the second single from their seventh studio album, Love Come To Life. The song is a testimony to the power of redemption. Weaver revealed that the message of the song is the understanding of how God's love for him can redeem his own self-image. He told NewReleaseToday: "'I don't doubt that God loves me, my parents showed that to me and I've never doubted how God feels about me. There's this problem of never letting that translate to how I feel about myself. I walked around carrying this self-deprecating, self-hating feeling. I sank into a depressed state. I remember being in my garage, my man-cave. One day after a workout, I was hating myself. I prayed 'God I know You love me completely, but why can't I love me?' I felt the Holy Spirit invade that space in my garage and He began to deal with my heart. God began to fill my heart and my mind with the stuff that He likes about me. It's unbelievable that the King of the Universe cares about me. He does that because of the blood of Jesus. He made me. He knows me more than anyone else. He told me He loves my smile and my heart for people. He put that inside of me. He broke down that self-hating feeling. I've been sharing my story for the past year and it has brought people out of the woodwork, and it dawned on me one night that I don't feel like I hate myself anymore. That healing is available to all of us. We just need to make ourselves vulnerable before the Lord."

Music video
The music video for the single "Redeemed" was released on May 3, 2012. The video shows the band performing the song live.

Charts

Weekly charts

Year-end charts

Decade-end charts

Certifications

References

2012 songs
2012 singles
Big Daddy Weave songs
Curb Records singles